Henry Sewell (October 8, 1882 – September 15, 1953) was a British athlete.  He competed in the 3,200 metres steeplechase at the 1908 Summer Olympics in London.

In the first round of the race, Sewell ran a tight race with James Lightbody of the United States, a former Olympic steeplechase champion.  Near the very end, Sewell pulled away and won by about ten yards.  This qualified him for the final, in which he placed fifth.

References

External links 
 Profile at Sports-Reference.com

Olympic athletes of Great Britain
Athletes (track and field) at the 1908 Summer Olympics
1882 births
1953 deaths
British male steeplechase runners